Thurgau, anglicized as Thurgovia, more formally the Canton of Thurgau, is one of the 26 cantons forming the Swiss Confederation. It is composed of five districts and its capital is Frauenfeld.

Thurgau is part of Eastern Switzerland. It is named for the river Thur, and the name Thurgovia was historically used for a larger area, including part of this river's basin upstream of the modern canton. The area of what is now Thurgau was acquired as subject territories by the cantons of the Old Swiss Confederacy from the mid 15th century. Thurgau was first declared a canton in its own right at the formation of the Helvetic Republic in 1798.

In 2007, there were a total of 47,390 resident foreigners, constituting 19.9% of the population.

History

In prehistoric times the lands of the canton were inhabited by people of the Pfyn culture along Lake Constance. During Roman times the canton was part of the province Raetia until in 450 the lands were settled by the Alamanni.

In the 6th century Thurgovia became a Gau of the Frankish Empire as part of Alemannia, passing to the Duchy of Swabia in the early 10th century. At this time, Thurgovia included not just what is now the canton of Thurgau, but also much of the territory of the modern canton of St. Gallen, the Appenzell and the eastern parts of the canton of Zurich.

The most important cities of Thurgovia in the early medieval period were Constance as the seat of the bishop, and St. Gallen for its abbey.

The dukes of Zähringen and the counts of Kyburg took over much of the land in the High Middle Ages. The town of Zürich was part of the Thurgau until it became reichsunmittelbar in 1218. When the Kyburg dynasty became extinct in 1264 the Habsburgs took over that land.

The Old Swiss Confederacy allied with ten freed bailiwicks of the former Toggenburg seized the lands of the Thurgau from the Habsburgs in 1460, and it became a subject territory of seven Swiss cantons (Zurich, Lucerne, Uri, Schwyz, Unterwalden, Zug and Glarus).

During the Protestant Reformation in Switzerland, both the Catholic and emerging Reformed parties sought to swing the subject territories, such as the Thurgau, to their side. In 1524, in an incident that resonated across Switzerland, local peasants occupied the cloister of Ittingen in the Thurgau, driving out the monks, destroying documents, and devastating the wine-cellar. Between 1526 and 1531, most of the Thurgau's population adopted the new Reformed faith spreading from Zurich; Zurich's defeat in the War of Kappel (1531) ended Reformed predominance. Instead, the First Peace of Kappel protected both Catholic and Reformed worship, though the provisions of the treaty generally favored the Catholics, who also made up a majority among the seven ruling cantons. Religious tensions over the Thurgau were an important background to the First War of Villmergen (1656), during which Zurich briefly occupied the Thurgau.

In 1798 the land became a canton for the first time as part of the Helvetic Republic. In 1803, as part of the Act of Mediation, the canton of Thurgau became a member of the Swiss confederation. The cantonal coat of arms was designed in 1803, based on the coat of arms of the House of Kyburg which ruled the Thurgau in the 13th century, changing the background to green-and-white, at the time considered "revolutionary" colours (c.f. tricolour); as the placement of a yellow (or) charge on white (argent) is a violation of heraldic principles, there have been suggestions to modify the design, including a 1938 suggestion to use a solid green field divided by a diagonal white line, but they were not successful.

The current cantonal constitution of Thurgau dates from 1987.

Geography

To the north the canton is bound by the Lake Constance across which lies Germany (Baden-Württemberg and Bavaria) and Austria (Vorarlberg). The Rhine creates the border in the northwest. To the south lies the canton of St. Gallen; to the west lie the cantons of Zürich and Schaffhausen.

One of these stretches along Lake Constance in the north. Another is further inland between the Thur and the river Murg. The third one forms the southern border of the canton and merges with the Hörnli mountain in the pre-Alps.

Demographics
The canton is mostly German speaking. The population is split between Protestants (45%) and Roman Catholics (36%).

Historical population 
The historical population is given in the following table:

Political subdivisions

Districts 

Since January 2011, Thurgau has been divided into five districts which are named after their capitals. Before this date, there were eight districts - (Steckborn District, Bischofszell District and Diessenhofen District formed their own districts with their surrounding municipalities).
 Frauenfeld District with capital Frauenfeld
 Kreuzlingen District with capital Kreuzlingen
 Weinfelden District with capital Weinfelden
 Münchwilen District with capital Münchwilen
 Arbon District with capital Arbon

Municipalities

, there are 80 municipalities in the canton.
The ten largest municipalities by population are:

Politics

Federal election results 

 FDP before 2009, FDP.The Liberals after 2009
 "*" indicates that the party was not on the ballot in this canton.

Economy
The canton of Thurgau is known for its agricultural produce. Particularly, apples, pears, fruits and vegetables are well-known. The many orchards in the canton are mainly used for the production of cider. Wine is produced in the Thur valley.

There is also industry in the canton of Thurgau. The main industries are printing, textiles and handicrafts. Small and middle-sized businesses are important for the cantonal economy. Many of these are concentrated around the capital.

Notes and references

External links

  
 Official statistics

 
Cantons of Switzerland
Cantons of the Helvetic Republic
Former condominiums of Switzerland
States and territories established in 1803
15th-century establishments in the Old Swiss Confederacy
1460s establishments in the Holy Roman Empire
1460 establishments in Europe
1803 establishments in Switzerland